Atul Khatik is an Indian politician belonging to Bahujan Samaj Party. He was elected from Hastinapur assembly constituency in the 1996 Uttar Pradesh Legislative Assembly elections.

References

External links 
Atul Khatik on twitter

Living people
Year of birth missing (living people)
Indian politicians
Bahujan Samaj Party politicians from Uttar Pradesh